The 2018–19 Sacramento State Hornets men's basketball team represented California State University, Sacramento in the 2018–19 NCAA Division I men's basketball season. The Hornets were led by eleventh-year head coach Brian Katz and competed at The Nest as a member of the Big Sky Conference for the 23rd consecutive season. They finished the season 15–16, 8–12 in Big Sky play to finish in a tie for eighth place. They defeated Northern Arizona in the first round of the Big Sky tournament before losing in the quarterfinals to Montana.

Before the season

The Hornets finished 7–25 overall, and 4–14 in the conference. During the season, the Hornets participated in the Wooden Legacy, which was held in Fullerton, California. Sacramento State earned 8th place by losing to Cal State Fullerton, Saint Joseph's, and San Diego State. Sacramento State lost in both matches of the Sacramento Showcase against rival UC Davis and Portland. In the postseason, Sacramento State lost to Portland State in the first round of the 2018 Big Sky Conference men's basketball tournament in Reno, Nevada.

On July 19, 2018, the Sacramento State Hornets finished renovating The Nest's court. The renovation features include an emphasis on the main logo, implementing the school-known hashtag #StingersUp, and a redone of Sacramento State's colors.

Offseason

Departures

Incoming transfers

2018 recruiting class

Season
Senior Marcus Graves was named to the All-Big Sky Second Team.

Roster

Schedule

|-
!colspan=12 style=""| Exhibition

|-
!colspan=12 style=""| Non-conference regular season

|-
!colspan=12 style=""| Big Sky regular season

|-
!colspan=12 style=""| Big Sky tournament

References

Sacramento State
Sacramento State Hornets men's basketball seasons
Sacramento State
Sacramento State